This is a list of episodes for The Daily Show with Jon Stewart in 2013. Every episode from June 10 until August 15 was guest hosted by John Oliver, as Stewart had left temporarily to direct Rosewater.

2013

January

February

March

April

May

June

† These episodes were hosted by John Oliver

July

† These episodes were hosted by John Oliver

August

† These episodes were hosted by John Oliver

September

October

November

December

References
 

 
Daily Show guests
Daily Show guests (2013)